The black-backed yellow-lined ctenotus (Ctenotus eutaenius)  is a species of skink found in Queensland in Australia.

References

eutaenius
Reptiles described in 1981
Taxa named by Glen Milton Storr